is a politically independent former governor of the Kōchi Prefecture who served from 1991 to 2007, with an intermediate resignation in 2004 to test support after a scandal alleging transactions between his campaign aide and a construction company in 1991. He is also the host of "Wide Scramble", a morning show on TV Asahi. His policies included encouraging a more open government and the implementation of a green tax to help preserve forests. He is considered to be a reformer. Hashimoto is the brother of the former Japanese Prime Minister Ryutaro Hashimoto.

References

1947 births
Japanese politicians
Living people
Governors of Kochi Prefecture